Cicerone is an archaic term for a guide.

Cicerone may refer also to:

Places
Cicerone, West Virginia, United States
Cicerone Field, a baseball field in Irvine, California, United States

Occupations
Museum docent, a museum guide
An American trademarked term for beer sommelier, a professional beer server
Bear-leader (guide), a travel guide for young men of rank or wealth

Other
Cicerone Press, English publisher
Ralph J. Cicerone, American academic
VV Cicerone, a Surinamese association football club founded in 1929
Cicerone Manolache, Romanian footballer and manager
Cicerone Theodorescu, Romanian poet

See also
 Cicero (disambiguation)
 Tullia, daughter of Cicero

Romanian masculine given names